The Inland Empire Utilities Agency  (IEUA) is a regional wastewater facility and wholesale supplemental water supplier in southwestern San Bernardino County, in the Inland Empire region of Southern California.

Services
IEUA specifically provides water services to seven cities in the Pomona Valley: Chino, Chino Hills, Fontana, Montclair, Ontario, Rancho Cucamonga, and Upland. The Agency's service area covers 242 square miles and approximately 700,000 people.

IEUA's supplemental water comes from both imported water and recycled water. 

The wastewater treatment facility consists of domestic and industrial disposal systems and energy recovery and production facilities. The agency is also a biosolids and fertilizer treatment provider and remains a leader in protecting the quality of the area's groundwater.

History
IEUA was formed in 1950 as the Chino Basin Municipal Water District (CBMWD) and joined MWD in the same year. In 1998 CBMWD changed its name to the Inland Empire Utilities Agency (IEUA). The name change was meant to reflect changes in the District’s mission. 

In 2002 IEUA made history by becoming the first public agency to obtain a Platinum LEED rating by the USGBC

Chino Creek Wetlands and Educational Park 
In 2008 the Chino Creek Wetlands and Educational Park opened to the public. The park is located at the IEUA headquarters adjacent to the LEED Platinum buildings. Among many other things, the park features:  
 1.7 miles of trails
 22 acres of habitat
 6 connecting wetland ponds used for tertiary treatment of grey water before it is sent out to the Chino Creek
 One million gallons of recycled water flowing through its wetlands each day
 Wildlife monitoring stations

References

External links
Official Inland Empire Utilities Agency website
Environmental-expert.com: "How a LEED Platinum Building is Cleaning up Inland Empire Runoff" —  by Whitman et al (Water Environment Foundation).
 CoastalConference.org: "IEUA Chino Creek Wetlands Educations Park" — by Cole Slater, Stephen Lyon and Judi Miller.

Water management authorities in California
Water companies of the United States
Government of San Bernardino County, California
Pomona Valley
Special districts of California
Chino, California
Chino Hills, California
Fontana, California
Montclair, California
Ontario, California
Rancho Cucamonga, California
Upland, California
1950 establishments in California
Government agencies established in 1950